This is a complete list of ice hockey players who played for the Montreal Maroons in the National Hockey League (NHL). It includes players that played at least one regular season or playoff game for the Montreal Maroons while the team was a member of the NHL from 1924 until 1938. Founded in 1924 as an expansion team along with the Boston Bruins, 88 different players, 8 goaltenders and 80 skaters, played with the Maroons. The Maroons won the Stanley Cup twice, in 1926 and 1935, while eleven players have been inducted into the Hockey Hall of Fame.

The "Seasons" column lists the first year of the season of the player's first game and the last year of the season of the player's last game. For example, a player who played one game in the 1924–25 season would be listed as playing with the team from 1924–25, regardless of what calendar year the game occurred within.



Key
  Hockey Hall of Famer

The "Seasons" column lists the first year of the season of the player's first game and the last year of the season of the player's last game. For example, a player who played one game in the 2000–2001 season would be listed as playing with the team from 2000–2001, regardless of what calendar year the game occurred within.

Skaters

Goaltenders

References
Montreal Maroons all-time roster on the Internet Hockey Database
Montreal Maroons all-time roster at Legends of Hockey

players